Welsh Wood is a 3.2 hectare Local Nature Reserve in Colchester in Essex. It is owned and managed by Colchester Borough Council.

Trees in this site are managed by rotational coppicing, and include ash, hazel, sweet chestnut and the rare small leaved lime. It is carpeted by bluebells in the spring, and there are other flowers such as yellow archangel and wood anemone. Dead wood provides a habitat for stag beetle larvae.

There is access from Deben Road and Barbel Road.

References

Local Nature Reserves in Essex
Colchester (town)